Cool Boarders is a snowboarding video game developed by UEP Systems for the PlayStation.

The game consists of three main courses (plus two additional unlockables) in which the player attempts to gain the fastest time, most points from performing tricks, and also total points, a combination of the two previous disciplines.

This early game, while simple, led the way for the development of much more popular, extreme sport games.

Release
Cool Boarders was first released in Japan in August 1996. At this time Sony Computer Entertainment officials stated that, though snowboarding was not yet as popular in the West as in Japan, they were "seriously considering" localizing the game to North America. An emulated release for the PlayStation Network as a PS one Classic was released in North America on December 4, 2006, in Europe on November 8, 2007 in Japan on October 26, 2011.

Reception

Reviews for Cool Boarders were mixed. The game received an average score of 74% at GameRankings, based on an aggregate of 6 reviews. Critics praised the selection of boards which offer differing gameplay and the thrills in the experience, but criticized the lack of a two-player mode or AI competitors to race against and the bizarre physics, such as how the player character tends to get caught between closely placed barriers, ricocheting back and forth between them, and how hitting certain objects can make them slide uphill. Kraig Kujawa and Dean Hager of Electronic Gaming Monthly found that the game, while reasonably fun overall, could only be recommended to fans of snowboarding and other "extreme" sports. GamePro commented: "The controls allow for tight handling and make performing tricks a breeze. Although the graphics show minor breakup, they're still well animated in the popular polygonal style". Next Generation summarized: "Surprisingly, the first dedicated snowboarding game for PlayStation is a great deal of fun to play and offers a challenge like nothing else on the system. However, too many goofy flaws keep it from being a total success". GameSpot found the physics and limited ability to go off-course frustrating, and like Next Generation expressed hope that a sequel would fix the problems that kept the game from being great.

References

External links
 

1996 video games
PlayStation (console) games
PlayStation 3 games
PlayStation Network games
PlayStation Portable games
Single-player video games
Snowboarding video games
Sony Interactive Entertainment games
UEP Systems games
Video games developed in Japan